Angie Lee (born 1962 or 1963) is the director of student affairs at the University of Wisconsin-La Crosse since 2016. Before working at Wisconsin-La Crosse, Lee was an assistant coach with the Western Illinois Leathernecks women's basketball from 1987 to 1988 and a scout for the Iowa Hawkeyes women's basketball team from 1988 to 1995. Lee was promoted to head coach for Iowa in 1995 and was the 1996 Associated Press College Women's Basketball Coach of the Year. Upon her departure from Iowa in 2000, Lee was an assistant coach on the Virginia Tech Hokies women's basketball team from 2000 until she ended her coaching career in 2004.

Early life and education
In 1963, Lee was born in Paxton, Illinois with six siblings and played volleyball alongside basketball in high school. She continued to play basketball as a member of the Iowa Hawkeyes women's basketball team during her post-secondary education. At Iowa, she graduated with a Bachelor of Science in 1984 and a master's degree specializing in sports administration in 1987.

Career
Lee began her sports career as an assistant basketball coach for the Western Illinois Leathernecks women's basketball from 1987 to 1988. After leaving Western Illinois, she continued her assistant coaching tenure as a scout for the Iowa Hawkeyes from 1988 to 1995. When head coach Vivian Stringer left Iowa in 1995, Lee was the Hawkeye's interim head coach in July 1995 before her promotion to head coach in August 1996. While with Iowa, Lee and her team reached the Sweet Sixteen during the 1996 NCAA Division I women's basketball tournament. The following year, her team won the Big Ten women's basketball tournament. While at Iowa, Lee worked for USA Basketball as an assistant coach. With the American women's basketball team, Lee was one of the assistant coaches during the 1998 R. William Jones Cup.

In 2000, Lee stepped down from her coaching position at Iowa. Upon ending her coaching tenure, Lee had 84 wins and 60 losses with Iowa. That year, Lee was selected to work in athletic fundraising at the University of Denver. During June 2000, Lee became an assistant basketball coach for the Virginia Tech Hokies women's basketball team. 

When Lee ended her coaching career with Virginia Tech in 2004, she held multiple jobs including truck unloading and pet sitting. That year, Lee returned to academics to work in university admission and student affairs at the University of Wisconsin-La Crosse. In 2016, she became the director of student affairs for Wisconsin-La Crosse.

Awards and honors
In 1996, Lee received the Big Ten Conference Women's Basketball Coach of the Year and the Associated Press College Women's Basketball Coach of the Year while with Iowa.

References

1960s births
Living people
Basketball coaches from Illinois
Basketball players from Illinois
Iowa Hawkeyes women's basketball coaches
Iowa Hawkeyes women's basketball players
Virginia Tech Hokies women's basketball coaches
Western Illinois Leathernecks women's basketball coaches